Hunny may refer to:

 Hunny (band), an American rock band from Newbury Park, California
 "Hunny Hunny", a 1993 single by the synthpop band Book of Love
 Hunny B's, a breakfast cereal made by Kellogg's under license from Disney
 Hunny Madu, musician and radio host
 Honey, a misspelling, especially related to Winnie-the-Pooh

See also 
 Winnie-the-Pooh